This article is a list of châteaux in Pays de la Loire, France.

Loire-Atlantique 
In the former duchy of Brittany

Château d'Ancenis, in Ancenis
Château de la Bégraisiere, in Saint-Herblain
Château de Blain, in Blain
Château de Bois Chevalier, in Legé
Château de Bois-Briand, in Nantes
Château du Bois-Rouaud, in Chéméré
Château du Bouffay destroyed in the 19th century, in Nantes
Château de la Bourgonnière destroy in 2006, in Saint-Herblain
Château de la Bretesche, in Missillac
Château de Briord, in Port-Saint-Père
Château de Campbon, in Campbon
Château de Caratel, in Louisfert
Château de Careil, in Guérande
Château de Carheil, in Plessé
Château de Chassay, in Sainte-Luce-sur-Loire
Château de Châteaubriant, in Châteaubriant
Château de Château-Thébaud, Château-Thébaud
Château de Chavagne, in Sucé-sur-Erdre
Château de Clermont, au Cellier
Château de Clisson, in Clisson
Château de Conquereuil, in Conquereuil
Château des ducs de Bretagne, in Nantes
Château de l' Épinay, in Carquefou
Château de la Frémoire, in Vertou
Château de la Freudière, in La Chevrolière
Château de la Gascherie, in La Chapelle-sur-Erdre
Château de Gilles de Rais, in Machecoul
Château de Goulaine, in Haute-Goulaine
Château du Goust, in Malville  (voir Le Goust)
Château du Grand-Blottereau, in Nantes
Château de Granville, in Port-Saint-Père
Château de la Guibourgère, in Teillé
Château de Launay, in Sucé-sur-Erdre
Château de Lucinière, in Joué-sur-Erdre
Château de la Madeleine, in Varades
Château Mercœur, in Indre
Château de la Mesnerie, in La Chapelle-sur-Erdre
Château de la Motte-Glain, in La Chapelle-Glain
Château de la Noë de Bel Air, in Vallet
Château de l'Oiselinière, in Gorges
Tour d'Oudon, in Oudon
Château de la Pinelais, in Saint-Père-en-Retz
Château du Plessis, in Casson
Château du Plessis, in Pont-Saint-Martin
Château du Plessis, in Saint-Aubin-des-Châteaux
Château du Plessis-de-Vair, in Anetz
Château du Plessis-Mareil, in Saint-Viaud
Château de Pornic, in Pornic
Château de Portillon, in Vertou
Château de la Rairie, in Pont-Saint-Martin
Château de Ranrouët, in Herbignac
Château de Retail, in Legé
Château Saint-Clair, in Derval
Château de Saint-Mars-de-Coutais, in Saint-Mars-de-Coutais
Château de Saint-Mars-la-Jaille, in Saint-Mars-la-Jaille
Château de la Seilleraye, in Carquefou
Château de Thouaré-sur-Loire, in Thouaré-sur-Loire
Logis de la Touche, in La Limouzinière
Château de la Touche, in Nozay
Château de la Tour, in Orvault
Château de la Villejégu, in Couffé
Château de Villeneuve, in Pornichet
Château de la Vrillière, in La Chapelle-Basse-Mer

Maine-et-Loire 
Former province of Anjou

Château d'Angers, in Angers
Château de la Beuvrière Grez-Neuville, in Grez-Neuville
Château de Boumois, in Saint-Martin-de-la-Place
Château de Bourmont, in Freigné
Château de Brézé, in Brézé
Château de Brissac, in Brissac-Quincé
Château La Cailleterie, in La Meignanne 18th century
Château de Challain-la-Potherie, in Challain-la-Potherie 19th century
Château de Champtocé, in Champtocé-sur-Loire 13th century
Château La Goujonnaie, in La Meignanne 18th century et 19th century
Château de Grésillon, in Baugé 18th century
Château de Martigné-Briand, in Martigné-Briand
Château de Montgeoffroy, in Mazé
Château de Montreuil-Bellay, in Montreuil-Bellay
Château de Montsoreau, in Montsoreau
Château de Noizé, in Soulaines-sur-Aubance
Château de Pignerolle in Saint-Barthélemy-d'Anjou
Château du Plessis-Bourré, in Écuillé
Château du Plessis-Macé, au Plessis-Macé
Château médiéval de Pouancé, in Pouancé
Château Saint-Quentin, in La Meignanne 19th century
Château Saint-Venant, in La Meignanne 19th century
Château de Saumur, in Saumur
Château de Serrant, in Saint-Georges-sur-Loire
Château de la Turmelière, in Liré
Château du Verger, in Seiches-sur-le-Loir
Château de Villeneuve, in Martigné-Briand
Château de Villeneuve, in Souzay-Champigny

Mayenne 
Former county of Maine

 Château d'Ampoigné, in Ampoigné
 La Barbottière, in Ahuillé
 Château du Bas du Gast, in Laval
 Camp de Beugy, in Sainte-Suzanne
 Château du Bois Thibault, in Lassay-les-Châteaux
 Château de la Boissivière, in Argenton-Notre-Dame
 Château de Bouillé, in Torcé-Viviers-en-Charnie
 Château de Bourgon, in Montourtier
 Château de Champfleury, in Arquenay
 Château les Courans, in Longuefuye
 Château de la Courbe de Brée, in Brée
 Château de Courtaliéru, in Vimarcé
 Château de Craon, in Craon
 Château de l'Escoublère in Daon
 Château de la Fautraise, in Argenton-Notre-Dame
 Château de La Feuillée, in Alexain
 Château de Foulletorte, in Saint-Georges-sur-Erve
 Château de Fresnay, au Bourgneuf-la-Forêt
 Château de la Goinière, in Andouillé
 Château de Goué, in Fougerolles-du-Plessis
 Château de Hauterive, in Argentré
 Château de Hauteville, in Charchigné
 Château de la Lande de Niafles, in Niafles
 Château de Lassay, in Lassay-les-Châteaux
 Château de Laval, in Laval
 Château de Lévaré, in Levaré
 Château de la Marie, in Alexain
 Château de Mayenne, in Mayenne
 Château de Montchevrier, in Nuillé-sur-Vicoin
 Château de Montecler, in Châtres-la-Forêt
 Château de Montesson, in Bais
 Château de Montflaux, in Saint-Denis-de-Gastines
 Château de Montjean, in Montjean
 Château de Mortiercrolles, in Saint-Quentin-les-Anges
 Château de la Motte-Daudier, in Niafles
 Château de Pannard, in Ernée
 Château de la Patrière, in Courbeveille
 Château du Pin de Préaux, in Préaux
 Château du Plessis de Cosmes, in Cosmes
 Château du Plessis-Buret, in Sainte-Gemmes-le-Robert
 Château de Poligné, in Bonchamp-lès-Laval
 La Provôterie, in Ahuillé
 Château de la Roche-Pichemer, in Saint-Ouën-des-Vallons
 Château du Rocher, in Mézangers 
 Château de la Rongère, in Saint-Sulpice
 Château de Sainte-Suzanne, in Sainte-Suzanne
 Donjon de Sainte-Suzanne, in Sainte-Suzanne
 Château de Saint-Ouen de Chemazé, in Chemazé
 Château de Senonnes, in Senonnes
 Château de la Sionnière, in Argenton-Notre-Dame
 Château de Terchant, in Ruillé-le-Gravelais
 Château du Tertre, in Ambrières-les-Vallées
 Château de Thévalles, in Chémeré-le-Roi
 Château de Thorigné-en-Charnie, in Thorigné-en-Charnie
 Château de Thubœuf, in Nuillé-sur-Vicoin
 Château de Thuré, in La Bazouge-des-Alleux
 Château de Trancalou, in Deux-Évailles
 Château de Varennes-l'Enfant, in Épineux-le-Seguin
 Château des Ifs, in Montsûrs
 Château du Verger de Montigné, in Montigné-le-Brillant
 La Vieux-Cour, in Ahuillé
 Château de la Villatte, in Montigné-le-Brillant

Sarthe 
Former county of Maine

Château d'Aillières-Beauvoir, in Aillières-Beauvoir
Château d'Ardenay, in Ardenay-sur-Mérize
Château des Aulnays, in Torcé-en-Vallée
Château de Ballon, in Ballon, XIe
Château de la Balluère, in Pirmil, XIVe
Château de La Barre, in Conflans-sur-Anille
Château de Bazouges sur le Loir, in Bazouges-sur-le-Loir, XVe
Château de Bellefille, in Chemiré-le-Gaudin, XIe
Château de Bénéhard, in Chahaignes, XVIe
Château de Bezonnais, in Écommoy
Château de Brusson, in Soulitré
Château du Mans, XIe
Château du Gué de Maulny, au Mans, XIe
Palais des Comtes du Maine, au Mans, XIe
Palais du Grabatoire, au Mans, XVIe (palace)
Chateau de Connerré, in Connerré
Château de Courmenant, in Rouez-en-Champagne
Château de Courtanvaux, in Bessé-sur-Braye, XVe     Gothique
Château de Dehault, in Dehault
Château des Etangs L'Archevêque, in Saint-Vincent-du-Lorouër, XVIIe
Château de Gallerande, in Luché-Pringé
Château du Grand-Lucé, au Grand-Lucé
Château de La Grange-Moreau, in Vallon-sur-Gée
Château des Gringrenières, in La Chapelle-d'Aligné, XVIIe
Château de Launay, in Lombron
Château du Levain
Château du Lude, au Lude, XVIIIe
Château de Malicorne, in Malicorne-sur-Sarthe, XIIe
Château de Monhoudou, in Monhoudou, XVe monument historique
Château de Montbraye, in Parigné-l'Évêque
Château de Montfort-le-Gesnois, in Montfort-le-Gesnois
Château de Montmirail, in Montmirail, XVe
Château d'Oyré, in Clermont-Créans
Château de Poncé, in Poncé-sur-le-Loir, XVIe,
Château de Saint Paterne, in Saint-Paterne
Château des Salles, in Mayet
Château de Sillé, in Sillé le Guillaume, XVe
Château de Vaulogé, in Fercé-sur-Sarthe
Château de Viré en Champagne, in Viré-en-Champagne, XIIe

Vendée 
Former province of Poitou

Château de La Roche-sur-Yon Destroyed during rebuilding the napoleonic era.
Château d'Apremont, in Apremont
Château de la Bijoire, in Saint-Vincent-sur-Graon
Château du Breuil, in Saint-Denis-la-Chevasse
Château de la Cantaudière, in Moutiers-les-Mauxfaits
Château de Commequiers, in Commequiers
Château des Essarts, aux Essarts
Château de La Flocellière, in Saint-Denis-la-Chevasse
Château de la Guignardière, in Avrillé
Tour Mélusine, in Vouvant
Tour de Moricq, in Angles
Château de Noirmoutier, in Noirmoutier
Manoir de Ponsay, in Chantonnay
Château de Pouzauges, in Pouzauges
Puy du fou, aux Épesses
Château de Saint-Denis-la-Chevasse, in Saint-Denis-la-Chevasse
Château de Sainte-Hermine, in Sainte-Hermine
Château de Talmont, in Talmont-Saint-Hilaire
Château de Terre Neuve, in Fontenay-le-Comte
Château de Tiffauges, in Tiffauges
Château de Châteaumur, in les Châtelliers-Châteaumur
Château de La Vérie, in Challans
Vieux-château de l'Île d'Yeu, in l'Île-d'Yeu

See also 

 List of castles in France
 List of castles in the Pays de la Loire

References 

 
Châteaux